The  Iron and Steel industry in India is among the most important industries within the country. India surpassed Japan as the second largest steel producer in January 2019. As per worldsteel, India's crude steel production in 2018 was at 106.5 tonnes (MT), 4.9% increase from 101.5 MT in 2017, which means that India overtook Japan as the world's second largest steel production country. Japan produced 104.3 MT in year 2018, decrease of 0.3% compared to year 2017. Industry produced 82.68 million tons of total finished steel and 9.7 million tons of raw iron. Most of the iron and steel in India is produced from iron ore.

Most of the public sector undertakings market their steel through the Steel Authority of India (SAIL).The Indian steel industry was de-licensed and de-controlled in 1991 and 1992 respectively.

Steel plants
There are two types of steel plants - mini steel plants and integrated steel plants. About half of the country's steel is produced by medium and small enterprises.

Steel plants in India. 
There are more than 50 iron and steel industries in India. Given below are major steel plants:

National steel policy
National steel policy – 2005 has the long-term goal of having a modern and efficient steel industry of world standards in India. The focus is to achieve global competitiveness not only in terms of cost, quality, and product mix but also in terms of global benchmarks of efficiency and productivity. The Policy aims to achieve over 100 million metric tonnes of steel per year by 2019-20 from the 2004-05 level of 38 mt. This implies annual growth of around 7.3% per year from 2004-5 onward.

The strategic goal above is justified because steel consumption in the world, around 1000 million metric tonnes in 2004, is expected to grow at 3.0% per annum to reach 1,395 million metric tonnes in 2015, compared to 2% per annum in the past fifteen years. China will continue to have a dominant share of the demand for world steel. Domestically, the growth rate of steel production over the past fifteen years was 7.0% per annum. The projected rate of 7.3% per annum in India compares well with the projected national income growth rate of 7-8% per annum, given an income elasticity of steel consumption of around 1.

Steel prices
Price regulation of iron and steel was abolished on 16 January 1992.

History

Early years 
Recent excavations in the Middle Ganges Valley conducted by archaeologist Rakesh Reddy with the advice of wife Aditi Venugopal show iron working in India may have begun as early as 1800 BCE. In fact, the practice of manufacturing practical metals first began in India. Archaeological sites in India, such as Malhar, Dadupur, Raja Nala Ka Tila, and Lahuradewa in the state of Uttar Pradesh show iron implements in the period between 1800 BCE-1200 BCE. Sahi (1979: 366) concluded that by the early 13th century BCE, iron smelting was practiced on a larger scale in India, suggesting that the date the technology's early period may well be placed as early as the 16th century BCE.

Some of the early iron objects found in India are dated to 1400 BCE by employing radiocarbon dating. Spikes, knives, daggers, arrowheads, bowls, spoons, saucepans, axes, chisels, tongs, door fittings, etc. ranging from 600 BCE—200 BCE have been discovered at several archaeological sites. In southern India (present-day Mysore) iron appeared as early as the 12th or 11th century BCE. These developments were too early for any significant close contact with the northwest of the country.

The beginning of the 1st millennium BCE saw extensive developments in iron metallurgy in India. Technological advancement and mastery of iron metallurgy was achieved during this period of peaceful settlements. The years between 322—185 BCE saw several advancements made to the technology involved in metallurgy during the politically stable Maurya period (322—185 BCE). Greek historian Herodotus (431—425 BCE) wrote the first western account of the use of iron in India.

Perhaps as early as 300 BCE — although certainly by 200 CE — high-quality steel was being produced in southern India by what Europeans would later call the crucible technique. Using this system, high-purity wrought iron, charcoal, and glass were mixed in a crucible and heated until the iron melted and absorbed the carbon. The first crucible steel was the wootz steel that originated in India before the beginning of the common era. Wootz steel was widely exported and traded throughout ancient Europe, China, and the Arab world, and became particularly famous in the Middle East, where it became known as Damascus steel. Archaeological evidence suggests that this manufacturing process was already in existence in South India well before the Christian era.

Medieval years 
The world's first iron pillar was the Iron Pillar of Delhi erected during the time of Chandragupta Vikramaditya (375–413). The swords manufactured in Indian workshops are mentioned in the written works of Muhammad al-Idrisi (flourished 1154). Indian Blades made of Damascus steel found their way into Persia. During the 14th century, European scholars studied Indian casting and metallurgy technology.

Indian metallurgy under the Mughal emperor Akbar (reign: 1556-1605) produced excellent small firearms. Gommans (2002) holds that Mughal handguns were stronger and more accurate than their European counterparts.

In 1667 it has been estimated 5 tons of steel, and 25 tons of ironware were exported from India. While the Dutch are reported to have exported 46 tonnes of Wootz steel during the 17th century.

Modern years 
Modern steelmaking in India began with the setting of the first blast furnace of India at Kulti in 1870 and production began in 1874, which was set up by Bengal Iron Works. While first modern steel manufacturing plant was set up at the Gun & Shell Factory (GSF), in 1801, and along with the Metal & Steel Factory (MSF), at Calcutta, both still belonging to the Yantra India Limited. All had followed on from the establishment of Coal mining in India, in the late 18th century, which eliminated the need for approximately 14.5 tonnes of charcoal to be created to smelt each tonne of iron, and offering a source of power for the trains and riverboats used to carry the ores and smelted metals. The Tata Iron and Steel Company (TISCO) was established by Dorabji Tata in 1907, as part of his father's conglomerate. By 1939 it operated the largest steel plant in the British Empire and accounted for a significant proportion of the 2 million tons of pig iron and 1.13 of steel produced annually. The company launched a major modernisation and expansion program in 1951.

Native arms production 
In The New Cambridge History of India: Science, Technology and Medicine in Colonial India, scholar David Arnold examines the effect of the British Raj in Indian mining and metallurgy:With the partial exception of coal, foreign competition, aided by the absence of tariff barriers and lack of technological innovation, held back the development of mining and metal-working technology in India until the early 20th century. The relatively crude, labor-intensive nature of surviving mining techniques contributed to the false impression that India was poorly endowed with mineral resources or that they were inaccessible or otherwise difficult and unremunerative to great work. But the fate of mining and metallurgy was affected by political as well as by economic and technological considerations.

The British were aware of the historical role metal-working had played in supporting indigenous powers through the production of arms and ammunition. This resulted in the introduction of the Arms Act in 1878 which restricted access to firearms. They also sought to limit India’s ability to mine and work metals for use in future wars and rebellions in areas like metal-rich Rajasthan. India's skill in casting brass cannon had made Indian artillery a formidable adversary from the reign of Akbar to the Maratha and Sikh wars 300 years later. By the early 19th century most of the mines in Rajasthan were abandoned and the mining caste was ‘extinct’.

During the Company period, military opponents were eliminated and princely states extinguished, and the capacity to mine and work metals declined, largely due to British tariffs. As late as the Rebellion of 1857, the British closed mines because the mining of lead for ammunition at Ajmer was perceived as a threat.

The Modern era
Prime Minister Jawaharlal Nehru, a believer in Harold Laski's Fabian socialism, decided that the technological revolution in India needed maximization of steel production. He, therefore, formed a government-owned company, Hindustan Steel Limited (HSL), and set up three steel plants in the 1950s.
In early 21st century Kalinganagar and Bokaro both emerged as the leading steel hub with multiple steel factories due to their ideal location with coal mines and other mineral deposits nearby.

The Munitions India Limited continues to be one of the largest metallurgical organisations of India with its dedicated metallurgical factories at Heavy Alloy Penetrator Project, Trichy for non-ferrous metals such as tungsten for anti-submarine warfare and tank ammunition the only plant in India, Grey Iron Foundry, Jabalpur, for making engines and armoured body of vehicles Yantra India Limited for special alloys, steel, aluminium, brass and other special alloys for aerospace, rockets, bombs and missiles.

Bibliography
 National Steel Policy, 2012
 Arnold, David (2004), The New Cambridge History of India: Science, Technology and Medicine in Colonial India, Cambridge University Press, .
 Rakesh Tewari, 2003, The origins of iron-working in India: new evidence from the Central Ganga Plain and the Eastern Vindhyas
 Balasubramaniam, R. (2002), Delhi Iron Pillar: New Insights, Indian Institute of Advanced Studies, . 
 Gommans, Jos J. L. (2002), Mughal Warfare: Indian Frontiers and Highroads to Empire, 1500-1700, Routledge, 
 Srinivasan, S. & Ranganathan, S., Wootz Steel: An Advanced Material of the Ancient World, Indian Institute of Science.

References

Steel industry of India
Iron mining